Dongxi Township is a rural township in Cili County, Zhangjiajie, Hunan Province, People's Republic of China.

Administrative divisions
The township is divided into 13 villages, the following areas: Dòngxī Village, Tànpéng Village, Jīnzhú Village, Lánxī Village, Dàhǔ Village, Lèzhuāng Village, Bǎo'ān Village, Dàtián Village, Mǎgōngpíng Village, Zhāngsānxī Village, Hǎoxī Village, Ānlǐ Village, and Tiánjiā Village.

References

Divisions of Cili County